Oeneis tanana is a species of butterfly, a member of the Satyrinae. It occurs in Alaska, and is believed to be the only endemic species of butterfly in the state. It is speculated to be a hybrid species of Oeneis bore and O. chryxus. The species is threatened due to habitat loss.

Range and habitat
It occurs only in the Tanana River valley area of Alaska. This valley, or part of it, was a glacial refugium during the last ice age. O. tanana inhabits clearings in boreal spruce forests.

Larval foods
Speculated to be grasses and sedges.

Adult foods
Unknown, but related species sip nectar.

Life cycle
Adults are on the wing between mid May and early July, but mostly mid June. It takes two seasonal cycles for the caterpillars to completely develop. Adults are only found during odd numbered years.

References

Butterflies of North America
Oeneis
Butterflies described in 2016
Tanana Athabaskans